Nandikatta  is a village in the southern state of Karnataka, India. It is located in the Mundgod taluk of Uttara Kannada district.

Demographics
 India census, Nandikatta had a population of 7985 with 5640 males and 2345 females.

See also
 Uttara Kannada
 Mangalore
 Districts of Karnataka

References

External links
 

Villages in Uttara Kannada district